Antrodiaetus unicolor is a species of folding-door spider in the family Antrodiaetidae. It is found in the United States.

References

External links

 

Antrodiaetidae
Articles created by Qbugbot
Spiders described in 1842